The United States recognized the Republic of Texas, created by a new constitution on March 2, 1836, as a new independent nation and commissioned its first representative, Alcee La Branche as the chargé d'affaires in 1837. The U.S. never sent a full minister (the term "ambassador" was not in use) to Texas, but a series of chargés represented the government in Austin until Texas joined the Union in 1845.

Chargés d'Affaires

Alcée Louis la Branche
Title: Chargé d'Affaires
Appointed: March 7, 1837
Presented credentials: October 23–27, 1837
Terminated mission: Left Texas soon after June 5, 1840
George H. Flood
Title: Chargé d'Affaires
Appointed: March 16, 1840
Presented credentials: June 21–22, 1840
Terminated mission: Presented recall July 21, 1841
Joseph Eve
Title: Chargé d'Affaires
Appointed: April 15, 1841
Presented credentials: July 21, 1841
Terminated mission: Relinquished charge June 3, 1843
William Sumter Murphy
Title: Chargé d'Affaires
Appointed: April 10, 1843
Presented credentials: June 16, 1843
Terminated mission: Died at Galveston, Texas, July 13, 1844
Tilghman A. Howard
Title: Chargé d'Affaires
Appointed: June 11, 1844
Presented credentials: August 2, 1844
Terminated mission: Died at Washington, Texas, August 16, 1844
Andrew J. Donelson
Title: Chargé d'Affaires
Appointed: September 16, 1844
Presented credentials: November 29, 1844
Terminated mission: Left Texas on or soon after August 9, 1845
Note: Texas was annexed to the United States effective December 29, 1845.

Notes

Sources
United States Department of State: Ambassadors to Texas

See also
History of Texas
Ambassadors from the United States

 
Texas
Ambassadors